Vladimir Beara (26 August 1928 – 11 August 2014) was a Yugoslav football goalkeeper and manager. He played the vast majority of his professional club career for Hajduk Split and Red Star Belgrade in the Yugoslav Federal League and for the Yugoslavia national football team. He is considered to have been one of the best goalkeepers of his era.

Early life
Beara was born into an ethnic Serb family to parents Jakov and Marija in the village of Zelovo Sutinsko near Sinj in present-day Croatia. He had two brothers named Ljubo and Sveto. According to Split-based journalist Zdravko Reić, Beara declared himself as a Croat in the state censuses.

Club career
For Hajduk Split (1946–55) Beara played 308 games, and helped his team to win the Yugoslav League title in 1950, 1952 and 1955.

He made, however, a transfer in 1955 to Belgrade's Red Star (1955–60), after the season he had won the third league title. With Red Star he won even more Yugoslav league titles, in 1956, 1957, 1959, 1960, and won the Yugoslav Cup in 1958 and 1959. He was Red Star's goalkeeper against Manchester United in the last game United had played before the Munich Air Disaster. In 1963, the great Soviet goalkeeper, Lev Yashin said that not him, but Vladimir Beara is the greatest keeper of all time.

Beara ended his career in German clubs Alemannia Aachen (1960–62) and Viktoria Köln (1963–64).

International career
Beara played 59 games for the Yugoslavia national team between 1950 and 1960. Immediately after being selected to play for the Yugoslav national team, he became famous mostly due to his fabulous stops in a match against England at Highbury Stadium of Arsenal. Since then he was often called by his nickname Vladimir Veliki. Beara participated in the 1952 Summer Olympic Games; he was a member of the team that reached the final against Hungary, winning a silver medal. He also represented his nation in three World Cups; World Cup 1950, World Cup 1954 and World Cup 1958. In 1953, Beara was one of four Yugoslav players on the FIFA World-Stars XI who played an exhibition game against England; the match finished in a 4–4 draw, with Beara conceding only one goal.

Coaching career
In 1967 Beara finished a coaching course at the sports academy at the German Sport University Cologne, today's Hennes Weisweiler Academy. He went on to coach clubs in Germany, the Netherlands, Austria and Yugoslavia as well as the national team of Cameroon. A highlight of his coaching career was winning the Yugoslav national championship with Hajduk Split in 1971 as assistant coach to Slavko Luštica. This was the club's first championship since his departure as player in 1955. He also won the African Cup Winners' Cup with Tonnerre Yaoundé in 1975.

Death
On 11 August 2014, Beara's family announced that he died in Split, Croatia after several strokes over the previous year. He was buried in the Catholic Lovrinac Cemetery. The decision made by Beara's widow Jadranka to bury him at a Catholic cemetery was met with criticism, because Beara was a staunch believer of the Serbian Orthodox Church.

Style of play
Beara was an athletic and self-confident keeper, endowed with an eye-catching yet effective style. Thanks to his firm grip on the ball and his brave attitude, not only he was an outstanding shot-stopper, but he also excelled at coming off his line. He was nicknamed The ballet dancer with the hands of steel because of his ability to combine elegance with goalkeeping skills.

Quotes

Honours
Hajduk Split
Yugoslav First League: 1950, 1952, 1954–55

Red Star Belgrade
Yugoslav First League:1955–56, 1956–57, 1958–59, 1959–60
Yugoslav Football Cup: 1957–58, 1958–59

Yugoslavia
Olympic Games: Silver Medal 1952

References

Sources
Player profile on Serbian National Team page
Nogometni leksikon (2004) 

Meet Yugoslavia's ballerina Beara, once the best keeper in the world, guardian.co.uk

1928 births
2014 deaths
People from Sinj
Serbs of Croatia
Association football goalkeepers
Yugoslav footballers
Yugoslavia international footballers
Footballers at the 1952 Summer Olympics
Olympic footballers of Yugoslavia
Olympic silver medalists for Yugoslavia
Medalists at the 1952 Summer Olympics
Olympic medalists in football
1950 FIFA World Cup players
1954 FIFA World Cup players
1958 FIFA World Cup players
HNK Hajduk Split players
Red Star Belgrade footballers
Alemannia Aachen players
FC Viktoria Köln players
Yugoslav First League players
Yugoslav expatriate footballers
Expatriate footballers in West Germany
Yugoslav expatriate sportspeople in West Germany
Yugoslav football managers
Freiburger FC managers
Fortuna Sittard managers
HNK Rijeka managers
SC Fortuna Köln managers
NK Osijek managers
NK Troglav 1918 Livno managers
Cameroon national football team managers
FK Bregalnica Štip managers
First Vienna FC managers
RNK Split managers
Yugoslav expatriate football managers
Expatriate football managers in West Germany
Expatriate football managers in the Netherlands
Yugoslav expatriate sportspeople in the Netherlands
Expatriate football managers in Cameroon
Yugoslav expatriate sportspeople in Cameroon
Expatriate football managers in Austria
Yugoslav expatriate sportspeople in Austria
HNK Hajduk Split non-playing staff
Red Star Belgrade non-playing staff
Yugoslav Partisans members
Child soldiers in World War II
Burials at Lovrinac Cemetery